Yieldmo is a technology company focused on driving quality advertising. based in New York, New York.  Mike Yavonditte, Rick Eaton, Teddy Jawde, and Todd Coleman founded Yieldmo in 2012. Yavonditte is the company's CEO.

History
Michael Yavonditte, Teddy Jawde, Todd Coleman, and Rick Eaton founded Yieldmo in 2012. Yieldmo is a technology company focused on driving quality advertising. Yieldmo's technology powers a global marketplace that identifies and enhances the value of ad impressions through real time data intelligence and next gen ad formats across all screens. The founding team also built Quigo Technologies, a contextual ad network, which was acquired by AOL in 2007 for $363 million.

Yieldmo announced its Series C funding led by Time Warner Investments in October 2014. Additional investors included Google Ventures, Union Square Ventures and Genacast Ventures. The funding round brought the company's total funding to $22.1 million. In December 2014, Bloomberg listed Yieldmo in their Machine Intelligence Landscape report. In January 2015, AdExchanger listed Yieldmo's Hyperscroller as one of the most innovative mobile ad formats of 2014. Also in 2015, Yieldmo became the first mobile network to run comScore's Media Metrix for its mobile ad network rankings. Yieldmo delivered ad impressions to 105 million smartphones, an audience that only four other media properties, including Yahoo!, Google, Amazon and Facebook, have been able to generate. Yieldmo was listed among Deloitte's Technology Fast 500 in 2017 and 2018. Yieldmo was also listed as Crain's 2020 Best Places to Work in NYC in 2020.

References

American companies established in 2012
Companies based in New York (state)
Advertising industry
Advertising agencies of the United States